Tom Osborne (born 1964) is a politician in Newfoundland and Labrador, Canada. He represents the district of Waterford Valley in the Newfoundland and Labrador House of Assembly. He is a member of the Liberal Party, a former member of the Progressive Conservative Party, and a former Minister in Danny Williams' first cabinet. He is currently Minister of Health and Community Services in the Furey government.

Osborne is the province's longest consecutively-serving MHA having been in the House of Assembly since 1996.

Politics
Prior to entering politics Osborne worked for Statistics Canada, Small Business Enterprise, and with the Penney Group of Companies. He is the son of former MHA Sheila Osborne.

Opposition
Osborne was first elected to the Newfoundland and Labrador House of Assembly in the 1996 provincial election in the district of St. John's South. The election resulted in a landslide victory for Brian Tobin's Liberals and Osborne was one of only nine Progressive Conservatives elected. Osborne was re-elected in the 1999 election and though the PC's had gained 5 seats the Liberals still won a large majority government.

In government
With the victory of the Progressive Conservatives in the 2003 election Premier Danny Williams appointed Osborne to Cabinet as the Minister responsible for Environment and Labour. On February 20, 2004 Government announced a restructuring of departments, which saw the creation of the new Department of Environment and Conservation, which Osborne remained minister of.

On March 14, 2006, Osborne became Minister of Health and Community Services succeeding John Ottenheimer. During his time as Minister of Health more information on errors in hormone receptor breast cancer testing were coming to light. The errors eventually led to the Commission of Inquiry on Hormone Receptor Testing.

In January 2007, with the announcement that several cabinet Ministers would not be seeking re-election in that October's general election Williams shuffled his Cabinet. Osborne was assigned the Justice portfolio taking over for Paul Shelley who was retiring from politics in October.

With the re-election of the Progressive Conservatives in 2007, Osborne was replaced as Justice Minister by Jerome Kennedy. Williams announced he would be nominating Osborne to serve as Deputy Chair of Committees in the House of Assembly and On November 1, 2007, he was confirmed to serve as Deputy Chair of Committees in the House of Assembly.

In 2008, Osborne testified at the Commission of Inquiry on Hormone Receptor Testing and was asked about his time as Minister of Health.

Opposition
In September 2012, Osborne resigned from the Progressive Conservative party citing the leadership of Premier Kathy Dunderdale and began sitting as an Independent. On August 29, 2013, Osborne joined the Liberal Party of Newfoundland and Labrador.

Ball and Furey governments (2015-present)
In the 2015 election the Liberal Party won control of the House of Assembly and Osborne was chosen as Speaker. Following the resignation of Cathy Bennett, Osborne was appointed Minister of Finance in the Ball government on July 31, 2017. He was re-elected in the 2019 provincial election. On August 19, 2020, he was appointed Minister of Education in the Furey government.

He was re-elected in the 2021 provincial election. On July 6, 2022, he was appointed Minister of Health and Community Services.

Electoral record

|-

|-

|NDP
|Matthew Cooper
|align="right"|1,599
|align="right"|31.4%
|align="right"|
|}

|-

|-

|NDP
|Alison Coffin
|align="right"|1,062
|align="right"|19.5%
|align="right"|
|-

|}

|-

|-

|NDP
|Keith Dunne
|align="right"|1,994
|align="right"|38.92%
|align="right"|
|-

|}

|-

|-

|NDP
|Clyde Bridger
|align="right"|571
|align="right"|11.69%
|align="right"|
|-

|}

|-

|-

|-

|NDP
|Tom McGinnis 
|align="right"|676
|align="right"|11.3%
|align="right"|
|} 
Dennis O'Keefe who ran as the Liberal candidate is not the same Dennis O'Keefe that was Mayor of St. John's.

|NDP
|Judy Vanata
|align="right"|374
|align="right"|6.14%
|align="right"|

|Independent
|Jason Crummey
|align="right"|101
|align="right"|1.66%
|align="right"|
|-
|}

|NDP
|Sue Skipton
|align="right"|858
|align="right"|14.35%
|align="right"|

|Independent
|Bill Maddigan
|align="right"|155
|align="right"|2.59%
|align="right"|
|-
|}

References

External links
 Tom Osborne's Liberal Party biography

Speakers of the Newfoundland and Labrador House of Assembly
Liberal Party of Newfoundland and Labrador MHAs
1964 births
Living people
Progressive Conservative Party of Newfoundland and Labrador MHAs
Politicians from St. John's, Newfoundland and Labrador
Members of the Executive Council of Newfoundland and Labrador
21st-century Canadian politicians
Health ministers of Newfoundland and Labrador
Independent MHAs in Newfoundland and Labrador
Finance ministers of Newfoundland and Labrador